Emil Mihaylov (born 1 March 1988)  is a Bulgarian footballer who plays as a goalkeeper.

Career
On 4 October 2014 Emil Mihaylov saved a penalty taken by Vladimir Gadzhev during the 1-1 draw of Marek Dupnitsa against Levski Sofia. Despite his excellent performance throughout the whole match Levski Sofia equalized from a second penalty which was taken by Miroslav Ivanov.

On 19 December 2017, Mihaylov joined Third League club CSKA 1948.

References

External links

1988 births
Living people
Footballers from Sofia
Bulgarian footballers
Association football goalkeepers
First Professional Football League (Bulgaria) players
Cypriot Second Division players
PFC Rilski Sportist Samokov players
Akademik Sofia players
PFC Ludogorets Razgrad players
FC Lokomotiv 1929 Sofia players
PFC Cherno More Varna players
Omonia Aradippou players
PFC Marek Dupnitsa players
SFC Etar Veliko Tarnovo players
FC CSKA 1948 Sofia players
Bulgarian expatriate footballers
Bulgarian expatriate sportspeople in Cyprus
Expatriate footballers in Cyprus